Albert Lawrence may refer to:

 Bert Lawrence (1923–2007), Canadian politician and lawyer
 Bert Lawrence (footballer) (1902–1975), Australian footballer
 Al Lawrence (sprinter) (born 1961), Jamaican former athlete
 Albert G. Lawrence (1836–1887), American diplomat and soldier